Bruno Abdank-Abakanowicz (6 October 1852 – 29 August 1900) was a Polish mathematician, inventor, and electrical engineer.

Life 
Abakanowicz was born in 1852 in the Russian Empire (now Lithuania). After graduating from the Riga Technical University, Abakanowicz passed his habilitation and began an assistantship at the Technical University of Lwów. In 1881, he moved to France where he purchased a villa in Parc St. Maur on the outskirts of Paris.

Earlier he invented the integraph, a form of the integrator, which was patented in 1880, and was henceforth produced by the Swiss firm Coradi. Among his other patents were the parabolagraph, the spirograph, the electric bell used in trains, and an electric arc lamp of his own design. Abakanowicz published several works, including works on statistics, integrators and numerous popular scientific works, such as one describing his integraph. He was also hired by the French government as an expert on electrification and was the main engineer behind the electrification of, among other places, the city of Lyon. His patents allowed him to become a wealthy man and made him receive the Legion d'Honneur in 1889.

Around that time he retired to a small island in Trégastel, off the coast of Brittany, where between 1892 and 1896 he erected a neo-Gothic manor. Although the construction works were not finished in Abakanowicz's lifetime, the castle of Costaérès became a notable centre of Polish emigree culture, housing many notable artists, scientists and politicians. Among frequent guests of Abakanowicz were Aleksander Gierymski, Władysław Mickiewicz, Leon Wyczółkowski and Henryk Sienkiewicz. The latter became the closest friend of Abakanowicz. It was in Abakanowicz's villa in Parc St. Maur that he finished his The Teutonic Knights and The Polaniecki Family, while the Quo Vadis novel, one of the works for which Sienkiewicz was awarded with the Nobel Prize, was written entirely in Abakanowicz's manor.

Bruno Abakanowicz died suddenly on 29 August 1900. In his will, he made Sienkiewicz the tutor of his sole daughter Zofia, who later graduated from the London School of Economics and the Sorbonne and was murdered during World War II at the Auschwitz concentration camp.

As for Abakanowicz's nationality, he was born in the lands which were once part of the Polish–Lithuanian Commonwealth. Some later documents refer to him as a Russian because at the time of his birth, Ukmergė was part of the Russian Empire. Encyclopædia Britannica calls him a Lithuanian mathematician in its article on the integraph. Others consider him a Pole due to his fluent command of the language, friendship with many leading Polish personalities of the time, and literary contributions in Polish.
His surname Abakanowicz which has Lipka Tatar roots goes back to the szlachta of the Polish–Lithuanian Commonwealth under the Abdank coat of arms.

Works
 Les intégraphes. La courbe intégrale et ses applications, Paris, Gauthier-Villars, 1886.  Translated into German as Die Integraphen. Die Integralkurve und ihre Anwendungen, Leipzig, Teubner, 1889.

See also 
 List of multiple discoveries
 List of Poles
 List of Russian inventors
 For other notable members of his family, see "Abakanowicz"

Notes

References
"Bruno Abdank-Abakanowicz" Polish Contributions to Computing

External links
Mathematical contributions
Description of Abdank-Abakanowicz quadratrix 
Other
Photo of Château de Costaeres built by Abdank-Abakanowicz near Trégastel

1852 births
1900 deaths
People from Ukmergė
People from Vilkomirsky Uyezd
People from the Russian Empire of Lipka Tatar descent
Mathematicians from the Russian Empire
Inventors from the Russian Empire
19th-century Polish mathematicians
Polish inventors
Emigrants from the Russian Empire to France
Chevaliers of the Légion d'honneur
Riga Technical University alumni